List of artwork associated with Agnes E. Meyer includes works donated by her and her husband Eugene Meyer to the National Gallery of Art, or works of her.

National Gallery of Art 
A selection of pieces of art donated to the  National Gallery of Art in Washington, DC. by  Eugene and Agnes E. Meyer.

Antoine-Louis Barye

Paul Cézanne

Édouard Manet

Pierre-Auguste Renoir

Auguste Rodin

Portraits of Agnes E. Meyer

Other

References 

Lists of works of art